Bourtie House is a Category A listed country house in Bourtie, Aberdeenshire, Scotland. It dates to around 1754, and it received its historic designation in 1971. It was originally the home of Patrick Anderson and Elizabeth Ogilvie.

See also
List of listed buildings in Aberdeenshire

References

Category A listed buildings in Aberdeenshire
Buildings and structures in Aberdeenshire
Country houses in Aberdeenshire
1754 establishments in Scotland